Araea is a genus of moths of the family Noctuidae. The genus was erected by George Hampson in 1908.

Species
Araea attenuata Hampson, 1908 Kashmir
Araea indecora (Felder & Rogenhofer, 1874) South Africa

References

Acronictinae